Satterjhora, a village development committee in Sunsari District in Province No. 1 of south-east Nepal. Its population (2011) was 9,507 in 1,889 households. Among them the male and female population was about 4,539 and 4,968 respectively.

This VDC is a combination of nine(9) villages known as wards. Main villages of Satterjhora are Hattimuda, Bhawanipur, Majhou, Thalaha, Holaiya, etc. Some community schools are Janata Madhyamika Vidhyalaya, Bhawani Prathamika Vidhyalaya, etc. and some private schools are Rising Public Academy, Pashupati Academy, etc.

Though the village is well connected by road, electricity but development of infrastructure is not rapid as expected.

A road construction programme is on process. According to the committee members, the construction program will be completed by 2018/2019. This road links District Development Committee in Inaruwa Municipality and Village Development Committee in Satterjhora VDC. Currently, it is almost completed half.

VDCs and Municipalities Of Sunsari District

 Amaduwa
 Amahibelaha
 Aurabarni
 Bakalauri
 Barahachhetra
 Basantapur
 Bhaluwa
 Bharaul
 Bhokraha
 Bishnupaduka
 Chadwela
 Chhitaha
 Chimdi
 Dewanganj
 Dharan Sub-metropolitan Municipality
 Duhabi-Bhaluwa Municipality
 Dumaraha
 Gautampur
 Ghuski
 Harinagar
 Haripur
 Inaruwa Municipality
 Itahari Municipality
 Jalpapur
 Kaptanganj
 Laukahi
 Madheli
 Madhesa
 Madhuwan
 Madhyeharsahi
 Mahendranagar
 Narshinhatappu
 Panchakanya
 Paschim Kasuha
 Prakashpur
 Purbakushaha
 Ramdhuni-Bhasi Municipality
 Ramganj Belgachhi
 Ramganj Senuwari
 Ramnagar Bhutaha
 Sahebganj
 Satterjhora
 Simariya
 Singiya
 Sonapur
 Sripurjabdi
 Tanamuna

Schools
Shree Janata Madhyamika Vidhyalaya, Hattimuda
Shree Bhawani Prathamika Vidhyalaya, Bhawanipur
Rising Public Academy, Hattimuda
Pashupati Academy, Hattimuda

Health
Satterjhora Health Post is a Government Body charge with providing health service.

Governance 

Satterjhora is controlled by the Nepalese Government.

References

Populated places in Sunsari District